Trevor James East (born 22 October 1950) was originally presenter of Tiswas; stooge to Chris Tarrant and Derby County obsessed. He was subsequently ranked 27 in The Guardian's "Media 100" most influential people in the industry.

Early life
He went to Bemrose Grammar School in Derby, a boys' grammar school.

Presenter
He began his television career as an ATV sports reporter, having been a disc jockey in Derby's clubs in the mid-1960s.

Series 2 of Tiswas began from late 1974, and spanned almost every Saturday in 1975, finishing in early 1976. The presenting team was doubled to four presenters, mostly culled from ATV's presentation department. Chris Tarrant and John Asher were joined by Peter Tomlinson and Trevor East.

Management
By October 1983, East was ITV's executive producer for Snooker. He failed, in negotiations with the WPBSA, to wrestle coverage of the World Snooker Championship from the BBC.

By 1992, as head of ITV football broadcasting, East fought against Sky Sports initial foray into football coverage. But he eventually became an integral part of the team that built Sky Sports' dominance of live top-flight football. and was later director of sport at Setanta Sports).

Personal life
He is the father of the television presenter Jamie East.

References

Living people
1950 births
British television presenters
People educated at Bemrose School
People from Derby